The Innkreis Autobahn (A8, Innkreis Motorway) is a motorway, or Autobahn,  in Austria. It runs from the  A1 and A9 junction to the border with Germany.

The last section of motorway was built in 2003. 

Autobahns in Austria